The 2016 Oceania Women's Sevens Championship was the sixth Oceania Women's Sevens tournament. It was held in Suva, Fiji on 11–12 November 2016.

Australia won the tournament as they won all six pool games to record the team's third Oceania Women's Sevens title

Teams
Participating nations for the 2016 tournament were:

Pool stage

Final standings

See also
 Oceania Women's Sevens Championship

References

External links

2016
2016 in Fijian rugby union
2016 in women's rugby union
2016 rugby sevens competitions
International rugby union competitions hosted by Fiji
November 2016 sports events in Oceania
Sport in Suva